The List of National Historic Landmarks in Oklahoma contains the landmarks designated by the U.S. Federal Government for the U.S. state of Oklahoma.

There are 22 National Historic Landmarks in Oklahoma. The following table is a complete list.

|}

See also
National Register of Historic Places listings in Oklahoma
List of National Historic Landmarks by state

References

External links 

 

Oklahoma
 
National Historic Landmarks
National Historic Landmarks